Turning Up and Turning On is a country album by Billy "Crash" Craddock. It was released in 1978 on the Capitol label.

Track listing
You Are Everything I Wanted You to Be
If I Could Write a Song As Beautiful As You (John Adrian) 3:26
Delilah
What Are Memories Made Of
Let's Go Back to the Beginning
Hubba Hubba
Rip It Up
Let the Good Times Roll
Lonely Weekends
Never Ending

References 

Billy "Crash" Craddock albums
1978 albums